Robert Stanford Brown (born December 8, 1941), nicknamed "the Boomer" is an American former professional football player who was a offensive tackle in the National Football League (NFL) from 1964 through 1973. He was drafted by the Philadelphia Eagles as the second overall pick in the 1964 NFL draft. He played for the Eagles from 1964 to 1968, the Los Angeles Rams from 1969 to 1970, and the Oakland Raiders from 1971 to 1973. He played college football at Nebraska.  Brown was inducted into the College Football Hall of Fame in 1993 and the Pro Football Hall of Fame in 2004.

College career
At the University of Nebraska, Brown was an All-America selection at guard, and was voted the offensive lineman of the year by the 1963 Washington D.C. Touchdown Club.

Professional career
Brown was drafted in the first round (second overall) of the 1964 NFL draft by the Philadelphia Eagles. The contract he signed with the team had a $100,000 signing bonus. After his rookie season in 1964, Brown was named the NFL Rookie of the Year. He was named to the Pro Bowl in 1965 and 1966 during his five-season career with the Eagles.

After asking for a trade from the Eagles, Brown was sent to the Los Angeles Rams in a five-player trade on May 12, 1969. The Eagles traded Brown, along with cornerback Jim Nettles, to the Rams in exchange for offensive tackle Joe Carollo, guard Don Chuy and defensive back Irv Cross.

Brown was traded by the Rams to the Oakland Raiders, along with two draft picks, in exchange for offensive tackle Harry Schuh and cornerback Kent McCloughan on June 23, 1971. During the 1971 season, he was one of five eventual Pro Football Hall Of Fame offensive linemen on the field for Oakland at the same time (with Art Shell, Gene Upshaw, Jim Otto and Ron Mix).

Brown was named All-Pro during five of his ten seasons with the Eagles, Rams and Oakland Raiders.  Named the NFL/NFC offensive lineman of the year by the NFLPA three times (1968-1970), Brown was also chosen to play in six Pro Bowls, three with the Eagles, two with the Rams, and once with the Raiders.

Awards and honors
In 1993, Brown was inducted into the College Football Hall of Fame. He was inducted into the Pro Football Hall of Fame in 2004.  Brown's No. 64 was permanently retired by Nebraska in 2004.

References

External links
 
 

1941 births
Living people
American football offensive guards
American football offensive tackles
Los Angeles Rams players
Nebraska Cornhuskers football players
Oakland Raiders players
Philadelphia Eagles players
All-American college football players
American Conference Pro Bowl players
College Football Hall of Fame inductees
Eastern Conference Pro Bowl players
National Conference Pro Bowl players
Pro Football Hall of Fame inductees
Western Conference Pro Bowl players
Players of American football from Cleveland
African-American players of American football
21st-century African-American people
20th-century African-American sportspeople